Ann Swisshelm (born March 9, 1968) is a curler from Chicago. Swisshelm represented the United States in the 2002 Salt Lake City Olympics and the 2014 Sochi Olympics. She has also been known as Ann Swisshelm Silver.

Career
Swisshelm began curling at age ten at the Exmoor Country Club in Highland Park, a suburb of Chicago.

She made her United States National Championship debut in 1995, where her team placed fifth. Since then she has competed in the National Championships 18 more times. Her team won the National title five times, in 1998, 2001, 2003, 2010, and 2013.

At her first World Championships in 1998, Swisshelm and team finished in a three-way tie for eighth. In 2001 her team improved to a fifth-place finish and a 5 – 4 record. Her best performance at the World Championships came with her third appearance in 2003. Team USA finished third in the round robin competition. In the semifinals they defeated Team Sweden (skipped by future Olympic Gold Medalist Anette Norberg) and advanced to take on Colleen Jones's Canadian team in the final. Playing in Winnipeg, Manitoba, they defeated the Canadians and Swisshelm earned her first World Championship medal. Swisshelm returned to the World Championships two more times, in 2010 and 2013, but failed to get a second medal.

Olympics
In 2002 Ann Swisshelm competed at her first Olympic Games. Team United States placed third after the round robin competition with a 6 – 3 record. In the semifinals the United States lost to the eventual silver medalists from Switzerland. In the Bronze Medal match they took on Kelley Law's team from Canada. The match ended with a 9 – 5 score with the Canadians taking the bronze medal. Swisshelm returned to the next two United States Olympic Trials after the 2002 Olympics only to finish second both times.

Swisshelm and her team again qualified to participate at the United States Olympic Curling Trials in 2014, finishing first in the round robin standings and defeating Allison Pottinger in a best-of-three series final to clinch the berth to the Olympics. At the 2014 Winter Games in Sochi, Swisshelm's team finished last with a 1–8 record.

Awards
2001 & 2014 United States Olympic Committee Female Curler of the Year
2003 & 2013 United States Olympic Committee Curling Team of the Year
2001 Frances Brodie Award Winner – World Curling Federation Sportsmanship Award
2008 Ann Brown Sportsmanship Award – U.S. Nationals

Personal life
Ann Swisshelm was born in Middletown, Ohio, and currently resides in Chicago with her husband Sean Silver. She graduated from Drake University with a Bachelor of Fine Arts.

Teammates
2002 Salt Lake City Winter Olympics
Kari Erickson, Skip
Debbie McCormick, Third
Stacey Liapis, Second
Ann Swisshelm, Lead
Joni Cotten, Alternate

2003 Winnipeg World Championships
Debbie McCormick, Skip
Allison Pottinger, Third
Ann Swisshelm, Second
Tracy Sachtjen, Lead
Joni Cotten, Alternate

2010 Swift Current World Championships
Erika Brown, Skip
Nina Spatola, Third
Ann Swisshelm, Second
Laura Hallisey, Lead
Jessica Schultz, Alternate

2014 Sochi Winter Olympics
Erika Brown, Skip
Debbie McCormick, Third
Jessica Schultz, Second
Ann Swisshelm, Lead
Allison Pottinger, Alternate

References

External links

1968 births
Living people
American female curlers
Olympic curlers of the United States
Curlers at the 2002 Winter Olympics
Sportspeople from Middletown, Ohio
Sportspeople from Chicago
Sportspeople from the Cincinnati metropolitan area
Curlers at the 2014 Winter Olympics
Continental Cup of Curling participants
American curling champions
American curling coaches
21st-century American women